James Burke is an inter-county senior hurler with Dublin. He made his Championship debut in May 2008 against Westmeath.

References

Year of birth missing (living people)
Living people
Dublin inter-county hurlers
Sportspeople from Dublin (city)